Adolf Fredrik Church is a church in central Stockholm, Sweden, named after Adolf Frederick. It was built in 1768–1774, replacing a wooden chapel from 1674, which was dedicated to Saint Olof. It was inaugurated on 27 November 1774.

Its cemetery is where René Descartes was first buried in 1650, before his remains were moved to France. Inside the church a memorial to the memory of Descartes was installed by Gustav III. Other famous people buried in the church cemetery include Swedish Prime Minister Olof Palme, who was assassinated only a block from the church, Prime Minister Hjalmar Branting, physicist Carl Benedicks, and the composer Anders Eliasson.

The church is currently headed by pastor Ted Harris.

See also
Adolf Fredrik's Youth Choir

References

External links
 
 

18th-century Church of Sweden church buildings
Churches completed in 1774
Cemeteries in Sweden
Lutheran cemeteries
Church buildings with domes
Churches in Stockholm
1774 establishments in Sweden
Churches in the Diocese of Stockholm (Church of Sweden)